The Rugby Post Office in Rugby, North Dakota, United States, is a post office building that was built in 1940.  It was listed on the National Register of Historic Places in 1989 as U.S. Post Office-Rugby.

References

Government buildings completed in 1940
Post office buildings on the National Register of Historic Places in North Dakota
National Register of Historic Places in Pierce County, North Dakota
Stripped Classical architecture in the United States
1940 establishments in North Dakota
Rugby, North Dakota